Toby is a popular, usually male, name in many English speaking countries. The name is from the Middle English vernacular form of Tobias. Tobias itself is the Greek transliteration of the Hebrew טוביה Toviah, which translates to Good is Yahweh. Yahweh is the name of the Jewish God. Toby is also an alternate form of Tobias.

It is also used as a contraction of Tobin, an Irish surname now also used as a forename.

People named or nicknamed Toby
 Toby Alderweireld (born 1989), Belgian professional football player
 Toby Bailey (born 1975), American sports agent former professional basketball player
 Toby Balding (1936–2014), British racehorse trainer
 Toby Barker (born 1981), American politician
 Toby Barrett (born 1945), Canadian politician
 Toby Brighty (born 1995), English Graphic Designer
 Toby Colbeck (1884-1918), English cricketer
 Toby Cosgrove (born 1940), American surgeon
 Toby Creswell (born 1955), Australian music journalist and writer
 Toby Fox (born 1991), musician and video game designer
 Tobias Toby Gad (born 1968), Los Angeles-based German music producer and songwriter
 Toby Garbett (born 1976), British rower
 Toby Gerhart (born 1987), American National Football League player
 Toby Greene (born 1993), Australian rules footballer
 Toby Harris, Baron Harris of Haringey (born 1953), British Labour Party politician
 Toby Gärnö Heikenen (1806–1887), Swedish mathematician
 Gary Toby Herald (born 1953), American politician
 Toby Howard (born 1960), English academic
 Toby Howarth (born 1962), Church of England bishop
 Toby or Theobald Jones (1790–1868), Irish Royal Navy admiral, Tory politician, lichenologist and fossil collector
 Toby Jones (born 1966), English actor
 Toby Keith Covel (born 1961), American country music singer, songwriter, record producer, entrepreneur and actor
 Toby King (born 1996), English rugby league player
 Toby Love, Puerto Rican singer-songwriter
 TobyMac, American Christian hip-hop artist
 Toby McGrath (born 1980), Australian rules footballer
 Anthony Toby Moffett (born 1944), American politician
 Toby Nankervis (born 1994), Australian rules footballer
 Toby Ng (born 1985), Canadian badminton player
 Toby Orenstein (born 1937), American theatre founder, producer, and director
 Toby Peirce (born 1973), English retired cricketer
 Sir Alfred Rawlinson, 3rd Baronet, nicknamed “Toby“ (1867-1934), English sportsman and intelligence officer
 Toby Regbo (born 1991), English actor
 Toby Riddle (1848–1920), Modoc woman, U.S. Army interpreter
 Toby Smith (rugby union) (born 1988), Australian rugby union footballer
 Toby Ann Stavisky (born 1939), American politician
 Toby Stephens (born 1969), English actor
 Toby Stevenson (athlete) (born 1976), American retired pole vaulter
 Toby Tiangco (born 1967), Filipino politician
 Toby Toman, British rock drummer
 Tobias Toby Turner (born 1985), American internet personality, actor, comedian and musician
 Toby Weathersby (born 1996), American football player
 Toby Wilkinson (born 1969), English Egyptologist and academic
 Toby Wright, record producer and mixing engineer
 Toby Wright (American football) (born 1970), American retired National Football League player
 Toby Young (born 1963), British journalist

Fictional characters
 Sir Toby Belch, from Shakespeare's play Twelfth Night
 Toby Cavanaugh, in the second book of the Pretty Little Liars series and a recurring character on the TV series of the same name
 Toby Damon, on the TV series This Is Us
 Toby Flenderson, on the TV series The Office
 Toby Hamee, from the Animorphs books by K. A. Applegate
 Toby Isaacs, on the TV series Degrassi: The Next Generation
 Toby Mangel, on the Australian soap opera Neighbours
 Toby Mills, on the British soap opera Hollyoaks
 Toby Mitchell, protagonist of the 1960s Canadian TV series Toby
 Toby Tyler, protagonist of the children's novel Toby Tyler; or, Ten Weeks with a Circus and the film adaptation Toby Tyler
 Toby Waller, the slave name of Kunta Kinte in the Alex Haley novel Roots and the television adaptation
 Toby Ziegler, the White House Communications Director in the TV series The West Wing
 Toby the Tram Engine, in The Railway Series of books and the spin-off TV series Thomas & Friends
 Uncle Toby, in the novel The Life and Opinions of Tristram Shandy, Gentleman
Toby, a dog in traditional British Punch and Judy puppet shows
Toby the Pup, in theatrical cartoons during 1930 and 1931
 Toby, on the animated series Beyblade: Metal Masters
 Toby, partial bloodhound in the Sherlock Holmes tale "The Sign of Four"
 Toby, the anthropomorphic cactus in the children's TV series Sheriff Callie's Wild West
 Toby, the invisible demonic entity in the horror film Paranormal Activity 3
 Toby, the baby in the film Labyrinth
 Toby, the boy in the film "Astro Boy"

English masculine given names
Masculine given names
Hypocorisms
Lists of people by nickname